Rana Chatterjee is a politician serving as the MLA of Bally constituency, since May 2021. He is a politician from All India Trinamool Congress.

Life 
Rana Chatterjee did his Bachelor of Medicine & Surgery from R. G. Kar Medical College, University of Calcutta in 1998. He holds a Diploma in Child Health from R. G. Kar Medical College, University of Calcutta in 2003, DCH (Sydney, Australia), PGPN (Boston).

Consultant Paediatrician at Woodlands Multispeciality Hospital, Belle Vue Hospital (Kolkata)

   Spouse:    Dr Rituparna Chatterjee (Ophthalmologist)

Children:          Rishika Chatterjee

Political life 
He contested as  All India Trinamool Congress candidate from Bally constituency. He won by a margin of 6,237 votes by defeating Baishali Dalmiya of Bharatiya Janata Party.

References 

West Bengal politicians
Year of birth missing (living people)
Living people
Trinamool Congress politicians from West Bengal
West Bengal MLAs 2021–2026